The Maryland Department of Commerce is a government agency in the state of Maryland in the United States. Although it was originally founded in 1884, the department came to be recognized as the Department of Commerce in 2015.

The mission of the department is the attraction of new businesses, the expansion and retention of existing facilities, and financial assistance and training. The Agency publicizes Maryland's attributes, and markets local products in Maryland and abroad to stimulate economic development, international trade, and tourism. The department also invests in the arts and promotes film production and sporting events in Maryland.

History and Origins

Maryland's decisions to develop economic opportunities began in 1884 with the creation of the Bureau of Statistics and Information of the Industries of the State. To guide development, the government needed to know the agricultural, mineral and industrial output of the state. In 1892, the General Assembly directed the Bureau to collect statistics on labor, wages and strikes; any information about agriculture calculated to attract immigration; and data on mineral products, manufacturing, transportation, shipping, and commerce. The Bureau also was to receive reports from all officers and institutions of the state, publish the information in book form, and annually revise and republish. By 1916, as the Bureau of Industrial Statistics, it reformed to become the State Board of Labor and Statistics. Its information-gathering continued as it reorganized into the Department of Labor and Industry in 1945. Until the department's focus shifted towards regulating the conditions of labor.

Department of Information
By 1948, another agency was formed to collect information about the state. Authorized by the Board of Public Works, the Department of Information began as a division of the Hall of Records Commission. In 1949, it became an independent agency. The department compiled data not only about industry and agriculture, but also natural resources, recreation, government, and history. To encourage a tourist and outdoor recreation trade, the department promoted Maryland and its products with films, photographs, pamphlets, and press releases.

Department of Economic Development
The Department of Information was superseded in 1959 by the Department of Economic Development. Its mandate — to advance the economic welfare of Maryland citizens by developing the state's natural resources, industrial opportunities, and tourism potential — was carried out by three divisions: Business and Industrial Development; Research; and Tourist Development and Publicity. Another forerunner of the current department, the Development Credit Corporation of Maryland, was created in 1959 to stimulate business and industry by making loans to small businesses when conventional financing was unavailable.

Department of Economic and Community Development
In 1970, the Department of Economic Development was reorganized as the Department of Economic and Community Development. Added to its economic responsibilities now were duties to protect and enhance the social, cultural and fiscal viability of Maryland communities.

Department of Economic and Employment Development
In 1987, the Department of Economic and Employment Development was created. It contained agencies and programs formerly administered by its immediate predecessors, the Department of Economic and Community Development and the Department of Employment and Training.

Department of Business and Economic Development
In 1995, the Department of Economic and Employment Development reorganized as the Department of Business and Economic Development to emphasize its mission of bringing new jobs and new businesses to Maryland.

Department of Commerce
In 2015, the Department of Business and Economic Development was renamed the Department of Commerce and reorganized.

Agency Organization, key services, leadership and Administration
The department's objectives are carried out by three divisions: Business and Enterprise Development; Marketing and Communications; Tourism, Film, and the Arts. The department also is aided by public-private commissions including the Maryland Economic Development Commission and the Maryland Life Sciences Advisory Board. Further assistance is provided by the Maryland Biotechnology Center, the Division of Administration and Technology, and its Office of Policy and Governmental Affairs, which acts as a liaison to the Governor, General Assembly, and private technology sector.

Leadership 
Commerce Secretary Kevin Anderson was appointed by Governor Wes Moore in January 2023.

Key services 
The department provides a number of services to create, attract, retain and expand businesses in Maryland. These include:

 building and site location services
 Finance programs, tax credits and training grants
 Business advocacy and consulting
 Technology transfer 
 Foreign direct investment
 Export consulting and marketing 
 Tradeshow and conference partnership

Division of Commerce
With 81 authorized positions and $51.9 million budget for FY2012, and branded the Division of Commerce in October 2015, originated in 1959 when the Department of Economic Development was created to encourage businesses to locate in Maryland and to retain and expand their existing enterprises.

The division oversees five offices: Business Development; Business Services; Finance Programs; International Investment and Trade; and Military and Federal Affairs. By attracting new and expanding businesses, the division aims to help create jobs and improve the state's economy. It also assists domestic and international firms in finding attractive locations in Maryland and promotes international trade opportunities to Maryland firms.

Office of Finance Programs
The Office of Finance Programs, with an FY2012 appropriation of $3.5 million and 26 employees, directs and supervises certain state funds used as incentives or seed money for businesses in Maryland. These funds enable the state to retain businesses and attract new ones; foster economic growth; create new jobs; support commercial and industrial redevelopment; and help small, minority and high technology businesses.

The office is mandated by statute to be responsible for the Economic Development Opportunities Program (Sunny Day) Fund; Enterprise Fund (includes Challenge Investment Program); Maryland Competitive Advantage Financing Fund; Maryland Economic Adjustment Fund; Maryland Economic Development Assistance Authority and Fund; Maryland Industrial Development Financing Authority; Maryland Small Business Development Financing Authority; and Smart Growth Economic Development Infrastructure (One Maryland) Fund. Also under the team is the Maryland Economic Adjustment Financing Committee.

Maryland Venture Fund
The Maryland Venture Fund (MVF) provides for direct investment in Maryland companies through the Challenge Investment, Enterprise Investment, and the Enterprise Venture-Capital Limited Partnership programs. The fund organized as the Investment Financing Group in 1995. Formerly under the Division of Financing Programs, the fund transferred to Technology Strategy and Business Development in December 2003, and reformed as Venture Capital under the Deputy Secretary in 2005.

MVF focuses on seed and early stage investments, often equity and convertible debt, in amounts between $100,000 and $1,000,000 for companies with fewer than 250 employees. It invests in companies that maintain a principal place of business in Maryland or that commit to moving to Maryland if their principal offices re outside the state. It aims to leverage growth in industries such as software, information technology (IT), communications, cyber security, education tech, energy tech, health care IT, diagnostics and medical devices.

Division of Tourism, Film and the Arts

With an FY2012 appropriation of $26.6 million and 42 employees, the division of Tourism, Film and the Arts promotes Maryland as a destination for domestic and international travelers. The division also supports the performing, visual and creative arts and promotes Maryland as a location for film and television production. The division includes the Maryland State Arts Council, the Maryland Film Office, and the Office of Tourism Development.

Maryland Office of Tourism Development
The Office of Tourism Development had formed as the Tourism Development Office by 1981 and reorganized within the Division of Tourism, Film, and the Arts under its present name in 1996. The office has an FY2012 appropriation of nearly $3.6 million and 25 employees.  In fiscal 2011, the state's tourism industry generated $359 million, more than 5.1 percent over fiscal 2010. From 2007 to 2010, the number of visitors to Maryland grew by 5 million and the state increased its market share 16.9 percent. Maryland drew 32.2 million visitors in 2010, up 10.7 percent from 2009.

To stimulate tourism, the Office develops recreational, historical and cultural attractions. The Office promotes Maryland as a travel destination for domestic and international tourists. Additionally, the staff advises third-party sellers of travel such as travel agents, and tour operators. There is a public relations staff that has assisted travel writers to generate nearly $7 million in destination publicity. The office also manages three Welcome centers.

Maryland State Arts Council
The Council supports the performing, visual and creative arts, including dance, drama, music, architecture, painting, sculpture, graphics, crafts, photography, design, film, television and creative writing (Code Economic Development Article, sec. 4-502). Support takes the form of grants and special programs. The Council makes grants to individual artists, arts organizations, and county arts councils. The Council has 13 authorized positions and a $14.2 million appropriation for FY2012.

Maryland Office of Sports Marketing
Formed in August 2008 as a joint venture between DBED and the Maryland Stadium Authority, the Office of Sports Marketing attracts, promotes, and develops regional, national and international sporting events. The office evaluates Maryland's sports assets and develops strategies to increase the number of sports events, both professional and amateur, in the state.

Maryland Film Office
The Maryland Film Office promotes Maryland as a location for film and video production. The office is an informational and logistical resource for productions, and assists productions with location scouting, permits, casting, film crew housing, catering, equipment rental, and other production needs.

Division of Marketing and Communications
The Department of Commerce's Division of Marketing and Communications develops, coordinates, implements and evaluates proactive and integrated marketing activities for Maryland Commerce. Using research, brand assets and technology, the division communicates Maryland's competitive business advantages and quality of life. A centralized marketing resource, the division operates a creative and production shop, interactive program and business research and information services office.

The division coordinates and creates a number of publications such as the Department's Annual Report and online e-letters Business Pulse, a monthly report on business expansions, economic development activity and industry events; Economic Pulse, timely reports on Maryland's latest economic indicators; Global Pulse, Maryland-related international investment and trade news; Bio Pulse, quarterly reports on the state's life sciences community; and Cyber Pulse, which promotes Maryland as the nation's epicenter for cybersecurity and information technology.

The Public Affairs and Media Relations team maximizes Maryland's competitive business in broadcast, print and new media for local, national and trade media. The Office of Marketing consists of the Promotions and Events team, which coordinates opportunities to promote the Agency, and the Creative Services team, which develops the department's brand marketing, creative collateral and information resources to support the Agency's marketing initiatives.

The Research and Information team analyzes and communicates key economic and employment data. In addition to monthly reports on the economy, state rankings, and new and expanding businesses, the team also contributes to the department's many publications and strategic reports.

Maryland Biotechnology Center

As part of the Maryland BIO 2020 Initiative, the Maryland Biotechnology Center opened its offices in Rockville and Baltimore in September 2009. The center consolidates and coordinates existing initiatives in state government, the University System of Maryland, and the private sector to better support and expand biotechnology innovation and enterprises in Maryland. The Maryland Life Sciences Advisory Board guides center activities.

The Maryland Biotechnology Center awarded $1 million to five life sciences companies through its Biotechnology Commercialization and Translational Research Awards in December 2011. The awards have assisted 13 Maryland life sciences companies and three university research projects with nearly $3.1 million in funding since 2009. Maryland has approximately 500 life sciences companies engaged in pharmaceutical discovery, research tools development, medical diagnostics and device development, and contract research and manufacturing organizations.

The Center also aided more than 30 Maryland biotechs exhibit products at the 2011 Bio International Conference in Washington, D.C. At the event, Maryland Governor Martin O'Malley released a report that showed Maryland's life sciences industry employs 160,030 people — 71,600 directly – and accounts for 6.5 percent of the state's GDP. The industry was also found to create roughly $17.6 billion in economic activity and support $500 million in income and sales taxes annually.

Boards and Commissions
Maryland Commerce oversees the following organizations that are integral to its role and mission:

Maryland Economic Development Commission 
The Maryland Economic Development Commission establishes economic development policy and oversees department efforts to attract and retain businesses and jobs in Maryland. The Commission was revived in August 2009 and is chaired by Anirban Basu, Chairman and CEO of the Sage Policy Group. From the private sector, the Commission raises funds to supplement economic development programs and financial incentives to business. The Commission also advises the Commerce Secretary on regulations for financing programs and on the allocation of financial incentives. The Maryland Economic Development Commission was formed first by the Governor and then by statute in 1995 (Executive Order 01.01.1995.04; Chapter 120, Acts of 1995). See all commission members.

Commerce Cabinet 
Established October 1, 2015, the Commerce Cabinet is composed of the Secretaries of the Departments of Commerce, Transportation, Labor, Licensing and Regulation, Environment, Housing and Community Development, Planning and the Governor's Office of Minority Affairs.

Maryland Life Sciences Advisory Board

The LSAB was created by the legislature in 2007 to assist in maintaining Maryland's preeminence in the life sciences industry. Having 18 members, the Board includes the Secretary of the Maryland Department of Commerce, a representative designated by the Maryland Technology Development Corporation (TEDCO) and 16 members appointed by the Governor.

Advisory Council on the Impact of Regulations on Small Businesses 

The Advisory Council on the Impact of Regulations on Small Businesses was created by the General Assembly in 2015 to advise the Joint Committee on Administrative, Executive and Legislative Review on the potential economic impact proposed regulations may have on small businesses.

Maryland Marketing Partnership 
The Maryland Marketing Partnership, founded in statute as the Maryland Public-Private Partnership Marketing Corporation, was created to develop a branding strategy for the state, market the state's assets and encourage the location and growth of new businesses in Maryland.

Maryland Small Business Financing Authority 
Promotes the viability and expansion of businesses owned by economically and socially disadvantaged entrepreneurs, and also small businesses that do not meet the established credit criteria of financial institutions, and consequently are unable to obtain adequate business financing on reasonable terms through normal financing channels. Created in 1978, the nine members serve five-year terms.

Maryland State Arts Council 
In 1966, the Maryland State Arts Council originated as the Governor's Council on the Arts in Maryland, established by Executive Order. It became the Maryland State Arts Council in 1967 (Chapter 644, Acts of 1967). Formerly under the Department of Economic and Community Development, the Council joined the Department of Economic and Employment Development in 1987 (Chapter 311, Acts of 1987), and transferred to the Department of Business and Economic Development in 1995 (Chapter 120, Acts of 1995).

MIDFA/MEDAAF Authority 
The Maryland Industrial Development Financing Authority (MIDFA) and the Maryland Economic Development Assistance Authority and Fund (MEDAAF) are both served by the same Authority members. For MIDFA, the Authority reviews and approves financing transactions being issued as private activity bonds and loan guarantees; for MEDAAF, the Authority reviews and approves loans to support economic development initiatives.

Maryland Military Installation Council 
The Maryland Military Installation Council identifies the public infrastructure, potential impact on local communities, and support needed for State military installation development and expansion. The Council reviews State policies to support military installations and maximize economic benefits to local communities.

Maryland Public Art Commission 
The Maryland Public Art Commission implements Maryland's formal public art program through sculptures, murals and other works in an effort to enhance the cultural landscape of Maryland communities. Created in 2005, with 12 members.

Maryland Tourism Development Board

The Maryland Tourism Development Board was authorized in 1993 and reconstituted in 2007 (Chapter 625, Acts of 1993; Chapter 152, Acts of 2007). Chaired by Greg Shockley, the board stimulates and promotes travel and tourism in Maryland. Subject to the approval of the Secretary of Business and Economic Development and the Maryland Economic Development Commission, the board formulates a five-year strategic plan, an annual marketing plan, and an annual operating budget.

See also
 Business in Maryland

References

External links
 Official Web site
 Maryland Department of Business and Economic Development Portal
 Maryland Governor Martin O'Malley
 Maryland.gov
 Maryland Biotechnology Center
 Maryland Business License Information System
 Maryland Department of Labor, Licensing and Regulation
 Maryland Office of Tourism
 Maryland State Arts Council
 Maryland Department of Transportation
 Maryland Base Realignment and Closure
 Economic Alliance of Greater Baltimore
 Maryland Manual

Commerce
State departments of economic development in the United States